Yahaghi is an Iranian surname. Notable people with the surname include:

 Parviz Yahaghi, Iranian composer and violinist
 Mohammad Jafar Yahaghi, Persian writer, literary critic, editor, translator, and professor
 Behzad Yahaghi, Iranian artist and spiritualist

See also
Yahagi (disambiguation)